His Hour is a 1924 American silent drama film directed by King Vidor. This film was the follow-up to Samuel Goldwyn's Three Weeks, written by Elinor Glyn, and starring Aileen Pringle, one of the biggest moneymakers at the time of the Metro-Goldwyn-Mayer amalgamation.

Plot
Gritzko (John Gilbert) is a Russian nobleman and Tamara (Aileen Pringle) is the object of his desire.

Cast

 Aileen Pringle as Tamara Loraine
 John Gilbert as Gritzko
 Emily Fitzroy as Princess Ardacheff
 Lawrence Grant as Stephen Strong
 Dale Fuller as Olga Gleboff
Mario Carillo as Count Valonne
 Jacqueline Gadsden as Tatiane Shebanoff (credited as Jacquelin Gadsdon)
 George Waggner as Sasha Basmanoff (credited as George Waggoner)
 Carrie Clark Ward as Prinncess Murieska
 Bertram Grassby as Boris Varishkine
 Jill Reties as Sonia Zaieskine
 Wilfred Gough as Lord Courtney
 Frederick Vroom as English Minister
 Mathilde Comont as Fat Harem Lady
 E. Eliazaroff as Khedive
 David Mir as Serge Greskoff
 Bert Sprotte as Ivan
 George Beranger as (credited as Andre Beranger)
 Virginia Adair (uncredited)
 Rowfat-Bey Haliloff as Dancer (uncredited)
 Mike Mitchell (uncredited)
 Jack Parker as Child (uncredited)
 Thais Valdemar (uncredited)

Production
His Hour marked the first of five pictures that John Gilbert and King Vidor would make together for M-G-M.
Adapted from a 1910 novel by Elinor Glyn, an author of torrid romances chic in the 19th Century, His Hour was Vidor’s attempt to tap into the popularity of  Jazz Age "flaming-youth" pictures dealing with marital infidelity.
The movie includes many titillating seduction scenes, one of which was deemed too salacious for release.
Produced under the strictures of the new Production Code, producer Louis B. Mayer censured Vidor for incorporating some of Glyn’s “hot-cheeked” depictions of sexual decadence.

A former officer of the Russian Imperial Army, by now living in Los Angeles, served as a technical adviser on the film. His actual name has not been confirmed, however the studio press releases referred to him as Mike Mitchell. This film marked the first of four times that John Gilbert and King Vidor would work together. Despite showcasing his riding ability and appearance, Gilbert hated the script and felt it gave him nothing substantial to do as an actor.

Reception
In this, Gilbert’s first film with King Vidor, audiences were impressed with the star as a romantic leading man

Box office
According to MGM's records, the film made a profit of $159,000. MGM sent Elinor Glynn records which stated the film cost $211,930 and earned $317,442 resulting in a profit of only $105,511. This meant Glynn, who was entitled to 33.3% of net profits, earned $35,170.

Footnotes

References
Baxter, John. 1976. King Vidor. Simon & Schuster, Inc. Monarch Film Studies. LOC Card Number 75-23544.
Brownlow, Kevin and Kobal, John. 1979. Hollywood: The Pioneers. Alfred A. Knopf Inc. A Borzoi Book, New York. 
Durgnat, Raymond and Simmon, Scott. 1988. King Vidor, American. University of California Press, Berkeley. 
Landazuri, Roberto. 2009.  Bardelys the Magnificent. San Francisco Silent Film Festival (SFSFF) https://silentfilm.org/bardelys-the-magnificent/ Retrieved 11 June 2020.

External links

1924 films
1924 drama films
Silent American drama films
American silent feature films
American black-and-white films
Films directed by King Vidor
Films produced by Irving Thalberg
Metro-Goldwyn-Mayer films
1920s American films